Lara Gilchrist is a Canadian actress who voiced the role of Susan Storm (Invisible Woman) in the Cartoon Network's animated TV show Fantastic Four: World's Greatest Heroes. She also provided the voice for the character Angela in the movie Braver, and has appeared in TV shows such as Smallville and Battlestar Galactica.  
In 2011 she appeared in the Hallmark Movie Channel movie Goodnight for Justice.

She has done TV commercial voice work for the Edmonton Eskimos, Future Shop, Mothers Against Drunk Driving, Subway, and Super Seven lotteries. On stage, she has appeared in Victoria Maxwell's Life Line put on by Solo Collective, Hippies and Bolsheviks,
Ramifications of a Particular Crash,
True Love Lies,
and Enchanted April'' (based on a 1992 film).

Early life
Gilchrist is an alum of Studio 58.

Filmography

References

External links

Canadian film actresses
Canadian television actresses
Canadian video game actresses
Canadian voice actresses
Place of birth missing (living people)
Canadian stage actresses
Living people
21st-century Canadian actresses
Year of birth missing (living people)
Studio 58 people